Yarali may refer to:

Yarali-ye Olya, village in Iran
Yarali-ye Sofla, village in Iran
Yaralı, album
Şemsi Yaralı (b. 1982), Turkish boxer

See also
Yar Ali (disambiguation)